Investment is time, energy, or matter spent in the hope of future benefits actualized within a specified date or time frame.

Investment may also refer to:

Economics
 Investment (macroeconomics)
 Fixed investment, investment in physical assets such as machinery, land, buildings, installations, vehicles, or technology
 Inventory investment, the accumulation of unsold goods

Other uses
 Investment (military), the military tactic of surrounding an enemy fort (or town) with armed forces to prevent entry or escape
 Investment (film), a 2013 Marathi film
 Investment casting, an industrial process based on and also called lost-wax casting, one of the oldest known metal-forming techniques
 Invest (meteorology), short for Investigative area, a designated area of disturbed weather that is being monitored for tropical cyclone development
 Cathexis, also known as investment, a psychoanalytic term describing an investment of libido

See also
Invest (disambiguation)